Dorje Shugden (Wylie: rdo rje shugs ldan), also known as Dolgyal and Gyalchen Shugden, is an entity associated with the Gelug school, the newest of the schools of Tibetan Buddhism. Dorje Shugden is variously looked upon as a destroyed gyalpo, a minor mundane protector, a major mundane protector, an enlightened major protector whose outward appearance is that of a gyalpo, or as an enlightened major protector whose outward appearance is enlightened.

In Tibetan Buddhism, Dorje Shugden is considered to be the protector of Je Tsongkhapa's pure dharma, traditionally regarded as the founder of the Gelug school. The Dorje Shugden controversy arose in the 1930s within all schools of Tibetan Buddhism, including the Gelug school itself, regarding Dorje Shugden's nature, status of enlightenment, differences from traditional Gelug teachings, replacement of traditional Gelug protectors, sectarian functions, and actions by western adherents of the New Kadampa Tradition.

Origins

Minor protector
Dorje Shugden, also known as Dolgyal, was a "gyalpo" "angry and vengeful spirit" of South Tibet, which was subsequently adopted as a "minor protector" of the Gelug school, the newest of the schools of Tibetan Buddhism, headed by the Dalai Lamas (although nominally the Ganden Tripas). Georges Dreyfus says "Shuk-den was nothing but a minor Ge-luk protector before the 1930s when Pa-bong-ka started to promote him aggressively as the main Ge-luk protector." Dreyfus states "the propitiation of Shukden as a Geluk protector is not an ancestral tradition, but a relatively recent invention of tradition associated with the revival movement within the Geluk spearheaded by Pabongkha."

Pabongka's transformation
Pabongka transformed Dorje Shugden's "marginal practice into a central element of the Ge-luk tradition," thus "replacing the protectors appointed by Dzong-ka-ba himself" and "replacing the traditional supra-mundane protectors of the Ge-luk tradition." This change is reflected in artwork, since there is "lack of Dorje Shugden art in the Gelug school prior to the end of the 19th century."

Pabongka fashioned Shugden as a violent protector of the Gelug school, who is employed against other traditions. Shugden was a key element in Phabongkha's persecution of the Rimé movement. Within the Gelug school itself, Pabongka constructed Shugden as replacing the traditional Gelug protectors Pehar, Nechung, Palden Lhamo, Mahakala, Vaisravana and Kalarupa, who was appointed by Tsongkhapa.

Restrictions on the practice of Shugden were implemented by the 13th Dalai Lama. Pabongka apologized and promised not to practice Shuk-den any more.

Kelsang Gyatso
David Kay notes that Kelsang Gyatso departs from Phabongkha and Trijang Rinpoche by stating that Dorje Shugden's appearance is enlightened, rather than worldly. Kay states: 

Kay quotes Kelsang Gyatso's interpretation of Shugden's appearance:

Dreyfus describes the view that Shugden is enlightened as that of "most extreme followers of Shukden" and adds:

Kay states that "Shugden as an enlightened being is both a marginal viewpoint and one of recent provenance."

Characteristics

Name
Pabongka referred to Shugden as "Dol-gyel":

Iconography and symbolism
The entry for Dorje Shugden in Frederick Bunce's encyclopedia of Buddhist entities describes Dorje Shugden's appearance as follows:

Meanwhile, von Brück describes Dorje Shugden's appearance as follows:

A characteristic of the iconography of Dorje Shugden is the central figure surrounded by four cardinal emanations. According to Nebresky-Wojkowitz:
"In the East resides the 'body emanation' (sku'i sprul pa) Zhi ba'i rgyal chen, white with a mild expression" (Vairochana Shugden)
"In the South dwells 'emanation of excellence' (yon tan gyi sprul pa) rGyas pa'i chen." (Ratna Shugden)
"In the West dwells 'emanation of speech' (gsung gi sprul pa) dBang 'dus rgyal chen, of white colour, having a slightly wild expression." (Pema Shugden)
"In the North resides the 'emanation of karma' ('phrin gyi sprul pa) Drag po'i rgyal chen. His body is of a green colour, and he is in a ferocious mood." (Karma Shugden) 

Dreyfus describes the iconography of Dorje Shugden:

Control under Vajrabhairava
In Phabongkhapa's text, Shugden is to be controlled by Vajrabhairava. As von Brück explains:

von Brück provides a translation of Phabongkhapa's text which states:

Destruction by Fifth Dalai Lama
According to the early histories, the 5th Dalai Lama destroyed Shugden through black magic and tantric rituals. As Bultrini explains (with quoted phrases from the 5th Dalai Lama):

Terdak Lingpa confirmed:

Later adherents of Shugden revised history to state that the 5th Dalai Lama was unsuccessful.

Oracle
As with other spirits in Tibet, there is an oracle of Dorje Shugden.

Kay notes the presence of an oracle of Shugden conflicts with Kelsang Gyatso's portrayal of Shugden as a Buddha, since Buddhas do not have oracles. Kay states:

According to Nebesky-Wojkowitz, "The best-known of the prophetic seers who act as the mouthpiece of Dorje Shugden lives at a shrine in Lhasa called sPro bde khang gsar Trode Khangsar (rgyal khang) or sPro khang bde chen lcog. This is one of the few Tibetan oracle-priests who is not allowed to marry. In a house close to this shrine stays also one of the most renowned mediums of Kha che dmar po."

According to Joseph Rock, there were two main Dorje Shugden oracles: Panglung Choje and Trode Khangsar Choje. Rock witnessed and documented a public invocation of the Panglung Oracle in Kham (Eastern Tibet) in 1928. At that time, the oracle took a sword of Mongolian steel and twisted it into many loops. Choyang Duldzin Kuten Lama was the Dorje Shugden oracle for many years.

See also
Dorje Shugden controversy
Gyalpo

Further reading

Secondary Sources

Primary Sources

References

External links

 

 
Buddhism-related controversies
New Kadampa Tradition